2017 hurricane season may refer to:

2017 Atlantic hurricane season
2017 Pacific hurricane season